Gunsmoke: The Last Apache is a 1990 American Western television film starring James Arness, based upon the TV series Gunsmoke (1955–1975). It was preceded by Gunsmoke: Return to Dodge (1987). Subsequent TV movies are Gunsmoke: To the Last Man (1992), Gunsmoke: The Long Ride (1993), and Gunsmoke: One Man's Justice (1994).

Plot
The time of the film is just before the surrender of Apache Chief Geronimo on September 4, 1886, and the setting is in Arizona and Mexico.

Matt has been out prospecting and visits Dan Reilly's store to cash in his gold dust and pick up his mail, which includes a letter from Yardner Cattle Company in Arizona territory. The letter is from "Mike" Yardner (from season 19 episode 3, wherein Michael Learned portrayed a widowed rancher), urging Matt to return to her ranch if he can.

Along the way Matt is assaulted by a rock-throwing Apache boy named Nachite (Kevin Sifuentes), and meets a U.S. Calvary scout Chalk Brighton (Richard Kiley), who informs him that Geronimo is on the loose, but the real trouble is from the war chief Mandac aka Wolf (Joe Lara).

At the Yardner ranch, Matt finds Mike still alive after an attack by Apache warriors, but she tells him that her daughter Beth is in danger. After Beth is captured by Wolf, Mike reveals to Matt that Beth is his daughter. Together they head to the U.S. Calvary Headquarters in Madera to try and enlist the Army's help to rescue Beth, only to be denied by Gen. Miles (Hugh O'Brian). Matt and Mike hatch a scheme to exchange Geronimo's grandsons, Nachite and Kyeta, for Beth.

On their way, Matt and Brighton are waylaid by Colonel Aloysius Felton Bodine (Geoffrey Lewis) and his party of scalp hunters. Mike's sharp-shooting helps them escape Bodine, and they ride out towards Fronteras, Mexico.

Meanwhile, Wolf intends to take Beth as his wife.

Cast

 James Arness as Matt Dillon
 Richard Kiley as Chalk Brighton
 Amy Stock-Poynton as Beth Yardner
 Geoffrey Lewis as Bodine
 Joe Lara as Wolf
 Joaquin Martinez as Geronimo
 Sam Vlahos as Tomas

Special Guest Appearances:
 Hugh O'Brian as Gen. Nelson A. Miles
 Michael Learned as Mike Yardner

Co-starring:
 Peter Murnik as Lt. Davis
 Robert Covarrubias as Bartender
 Ned Bellamy as Captain Harris
 Dave Florek as Smiley
 Kevin Sifuentes as Nachite

Featuring:
 Robert Brian Wilson as Corporal
 Blake Boyd as Fraley
 James Milanesa as Sentry Soldier

Production
The film was shot at multiple locations in Texas, including Big Bend Ranch State Park, Alamo Village near Brackettville, and Bill Moody's Rancho Rio Grande near Del Rio. It was dedicated to Amanda Blake, Stan Hough, and writer emeritus, Ron Bishop.

Reception
The film ranked seventh out of the programs airing that week with a 19.7/32 rating/share.

References

External links
 
 Gunsmoke: The Last Apache at INSP.com

1990 television films
1990 films
1990 Western (genre) films
1990s American films
1990s English-language films
American Western (genre) television films
Gunsmoke
Films based on television series
CBS network films
American sequel films
Television sequel films